

Rosters 
Source:

References

External links 
 International Federation of American Football
 Schedule
 Medalists
 Results book

2017 World Games
World Games
World Games
 
American football in Poland